Pawai is a town and a nagar panchayat in the Panna district of Madhya Pradesh state in central India. It is mostly surrounded by rocky area.

Geography
It has an average elevation of 344 metres (1128 feet). Pawai is the administrative headquarters of Pawai tehsil, one of the largest tehsils of Panna district. It is situated on the bank of River Patne (Devanāgarī देवनागरी- पतने नदी).

Temples
Maa Kalehi Temple (Devanāgarī देवनागरी- कलेही माता) is a temple situated on the bank of river Patne. 
old Hanuman temple known as Hanuman Bhata (Devanāgarī देवनागरी- हनुमान भाटा),   
Under the pawai taluka Kuataal mela is organised in every chaitra Ram navmi near the Badkhera & Banouli gram about 30 km from Pawai. It is a large fest with many shops, food stalls & other activities.
Pawai is surrounded by hills. Near the Maa Kalehi temple is the 24 ft. Shiva statue which provides views of the temple and its surroundings.

Transport
Pawai is connected by road from Katni (60 km) and its district headquarters Panna (62 km). Bus facility is available from both the places on an hourly basis; the nearest railway station is Katni Junction (60 km) and Satna. The bus stand serves as a medium of transportation to the people living there to other villages and cities. Other places from where one can reach by bus route are Satna, Chhatarpur, Jhasi (via Chhatarpur) and Jabalpur. The nearest airport is the DUMNA Airport in Jabalpur which is 150 km from Pawai.

Demographics
 India census, Pawai had a population of 12,003. Males constitute 53% of the population and females 47%. Pawai has an average literacy rate of 57%, lower than the national average of 59.5%: male literacy is 65%, and female literacy is 47%. In Pawai, 19% of the population is under 6 years of age.

Employment
Agriculture is main source of the livelihood and due to lack of irrigation facilities people depend on a single crop. People are mainly dependent on monsoons for crops. Most cultivated crops are Wheat, Grams, Pulses.

Climate
Sub-tropical climate. Summers are somewhat scorching and temperature touches 40–45 Celsius. Winters are cold and comfortable and the minimum temperature generally remains under 8°C. Monsoon touches this region in June and continues till mid-September.
The best time to visit is during winters (October to February).

Places of interest

Pawai is surrounded by Bhander's ranges hill. There have been few occasion of flood of river Patne which stopped the city for even a week. Near Pawai many small waterfalls and wonderful view of mountains ranges could be the main reason to visit. Few of them are listed below:

 
 Maa Kalehi Temple, situated alongside river of Patne, is temple among visitors, also known for its annual festival, Pawai mela in the area. The area where the river Patne and Maa Kalehi Temple is situated is known as Kalehan. Every year, there is an organization of big fair adjoining this temple in the month of April near Ram Navmi festival. A large number of devotees come to this place every year to offer their prayer.  
 Pawai is also having an old Hanuman Temple Known as Hanuman Bhata (Devanāgarī देवनागरी- हनुमान भाटा). It is situated on over the top of a hill. There are large number of steps going towards this temple over this hill. 
 Pyramid-shaped hillock known as Toriya is also known to visitors. 
 There is also a Jain temple. 
 Silver Fall (regionally known as Chande; approx 10 km) flows during Monsoon season situated near Panna-Katni Road. It is full of greenery
 Pawai have another interesting place named Panni Naala next distance 3 km from silver fall.
 Jagannath Swami Temple in main city is known for its Rath Yatra.

See also
 Pawai (Vidhan Sabha constituency)

References

Cities and towns in Panna district